Back to Mine: Pet Shop Boys, compiled by synthpop duo Pet Shop Boys, is the twentieth compilation album in the Back to Mine series published by Disco Mix Club.

Overview 
The band's only condition for undertaking the project was that each member would be allotted his own disc — a first for the series. Each disc, consequently, reflects the most opposite extremes of members Chris Lowe and Neil Tennant's musical preferences. Tennant has suggested that the two discs, in combination, comprise the "Pet Shop Boys sound".

While most other installments of the series focused on various aspects of downtempo and chillout, Lowe's disc is oriented around upbeat disco music.  Tennant's disc, meanwhile, with classical and ambient music included, is more aligned with the series' overall style (though the inclusion of classical compositions is also relatively novel for the series).

The album cover is by the band's traditional designer Mark Farrow, differentiating it from the series' usual appearance.

Context 
Both discs include a song by Dusty Springfield, in tribute to the singer's considerable link to the band's history; as fans of Springfield's work, Tennant and Lowe went on to collaborate with her in several projects in the late 1980s and early 1990s.

"Passion", produced by the band's first producer Bobby Orlando, is cited by Lowe as one of the key reasons for the existence of the band, as the duo's appreciation for that and other Orlando productions led to Tennant's meeting with Orlando in New York.

Lobe and Dettinger would later produce remixes for the limited edition of the band's 2006 album, Fundamental.

Track listing

Reception
Allmusic reviewer John Bush rated the compilation album four and a half out of five stars.

References

Pet Shop Boys
Pet Shop Boys compilation albums
2005 compilation albums